Norsjø is a lake in the municipalities of Skien, Nome and Sauherad in Vestfold og Telemark county, Norway. It is 55 km² in area and 15 meters above sea level.

Norsjø is part of the Telemark Canal. Most rivers in Telemark meet Norsjø on their way before ending up in the Skien river or Porsgrunn river. Norsjø is a source of drinking water for Skien municipality.

References 

Lakes of Vestfold og Telemark